"Boy Oh Boy" is a song recorded by Canadian country music group The Wilkinsons. It was released in March 1999 as the third single from their 1998 album Nothing but Love. The song reached number 3 on the Canadian RPM Country Tracks chart and number 50 on the U.S. Billboard Hot Country Singles & Tracks chart.

Music video
The music video was directed by Deaton Flanigen and premiered in early 1999.

Chart performance

Year-end charts

References

1998 songs
1999 singles
The Wilkinsons songs
Giant Records (Warner) singles
Music videos directed by Deaton-Flanigen Productions
Song recordings produced by Doug Johnson (record producer)